AussieMite is an Australian savoury food spread made from ethical Australian and New Zealand ingredients. Gluten-free. Vegan. Rich in B Vitamins including Vitamin B12 and Iron.. It was founded by Roger Ramsey in 2001. The taste of the product is slightly salty and is used for toast, sandwiches, crumpets and cracker biscuits, as well as a filling for pastry products.

Nutritional information
AussieMite is low in sugar, fat and salt and it contains Vitamin B1, Vitamin B2, Vitamin B3, Vitamin B6, Folic Acid, Vitamin B12, and Iron and is vegan and gluten-free. There are no artificial flavours or preservatives.

History
AussieMite was founded by Roger Ramsey an agricultural pilot, inventor and the founder of Australian company All Natural Foods. It is a registered trademark of Australia, the United Kingdom, European Union, United States of America, United Arab Emirates, Japan, South East Asia and Asia.

See also

 List of brand name condiments
 List of spreads

References

External links

Australian condiments
Australian brands
Yeast extract spreads
2001 establishments in Australia
Food and drink companies established in 2001
Food and drink introduced in 2001
Brand name condiments
Food paste
Byron Bay, New South Wales
Companies based in New South Wales